Her is the objective and possessive form of the English-language feminine pronoun she. 

Her, HER or H.E.R. may also refer to:

Arts, entertainment and media

Music
 H.E.R. (born 1997), American singer
H.E.R. (album), 2017
 HIM (Finnish band), once known as HER in the United States

Songs
 "Her" (Megan Thee Stallion song)
 "Her", a song by Stan Getz from the album Focus, 1961
 "Her", a song by Guy from the album The Future, 1990
 "Her", a song by Swans from the album Omniscience, 1992
 "Her", a song by Pigeonhed from the album Pigeonhed, 1993
 "Her", a song by Tindersticks from the album Tindersticks, 1993
 "Her", a song by Aaron Tippin from the album What This Country Needs, 1999
 "Her", a song by Musiq from the album Soulstar, 2003
 "Her", a song by Eels from the album B-Sides & Rarities 1996–2003, 2005
 "Her", a song by Tyler, the Creator from the album Goblin, 2011
 "Her", a song by Poppy from the album Flux, 2021
 "Her", a 2018 song by Spratleys Japs

Other uses
 Her (film), a 2013 American science fiction film 
 Kismet (Marvel Comics) or Her, a fictional superhero

Places
 Helper (Amtrak station) (station code HER)
 Heraklion International Airport (IATA code HER)
 Khoy, Armenia (historical name)

Science and technology
 Hydrogen evolution reaction
 HER2/neu, a protein
 Hercules (constellation)
 Hydroxyethylrutoside, a flavonoid

Other uses
 Her (dating app), a geosocial networking app
 Her.ie, a website aimed at young women in Ireland
 Harvard Educational Review, a journal
 Herero language (ISO 639-3 code)
 Historic Environment Record, in the UK
 Housing and Economic Recovery Act of 2008, in the US

See also
Hers (disambiguation)
Hur (disambiguation)